Chinese Democracy is the sixth studio album by the American hard rock band Guns N' Roses, released on November 23, 2008, by Black Frog and Geffen Records. It was the first Guns N' Roses studio album since the 1993 covers album "The Spaghetti Incident?", and their first album of original studio material since Use Your Illusion I and II (1991). It was the first Guns N' Roses album without their longtime producer Mike Clink; instead, it was produced by singer Axl Rose and Caram Costanzo. It underwent a protracted recording process, delayed by personnel and legal problems, label interference and Rose's perfectionism.

From 1994 to 1997, amid creative and personal differences, guitarists Gilby Clarke and Slash, drummer Matt Sorum, and bassist Duff McKagan left Guns N' Roses, leaving only Rose, keyboardist Dizzy Reed, and guitarist Paul Tobias. In 1997, Rose, Reed, and Tobias began work with guitarist Robin Finck and drummer Josh Freese, and in 1998 bassist Tommy Stinson and multi-instrumentalist Chris Pitman joined them. The lineup shifted several times, incorporating guitarists Buckethead, Richard Fortus and Ron "Bumblefoot" Thal and drummers Brain and Frank Ferrer. Guitarist Brian May, vocalist Sebastian Bach, orchestrators Marco Beltrami and Paul Buckmaster, engineer Eric Caudieux, and producers including  Sean Beavan, Roy Thomas Baker, and Caram Costanzo worked on the album across 14 studios. The band recorded dozens of songs and suggested they could release them across multiple albums.

Chinese Democracy languished in development hell for eight years. Geffen originally planned to release it in 1999, but it was delayed and largely rerecorded in 2000. With costs reportedly exceeding $13 million, it became the most expensive rock album ever produced, and Geffen pulled their funding in early 2004. After missing a release date of March 2007, it was finally released in November 2008, dogged by leaks and legal disputes.

Preceded by the title track as a lead single, Chinese Democracy debuted at number three on the Billboard 200, and was certified platinum. However, it did not meet sales expectations in the United States. It received divisive but generally favorable reviews, achieved international chart success, and has sold over one million copies in Europe.

Background

In September 1991, Guns N' Roses released the albums Use Your Illusion I and Use Your Illusion II, which have sold a combined 35 million copies. In November 1991, during the Use Your Illusion Tour, rhythm guitarist and founding member Izzy Stradlin abruptly left the band, citing touring exhaustion and conflicts with his bandmates. He was replaced by Gilby Clarke. In November 1993, Guns N' Roses released "The Spaghetti Incident?", an album of covers of mostly glam rock and punk rock songs. Though it was certified platinum in 1994, it sold significantly less than their previous releases.

Guns N' Roses began writing and recording new music sporadically in 1994. However, bassist Duff McKagan said the band "was so stoned at that point that nothing got finished". Guitarist Slash accused singer Axl Rose of running the band "like a dictatorship". Rose said the material was scrapped because the band was unable to collaborate.

In 1994, Clarke was replaced by Rose's childhood friend and Hollywood Rose collaborator Paul Tobias. Around this time, Rose became "obsessed" with electronica and industrial rock, particularly the work of Nine Inch Nails, and wanted Guns N' Roses to move towards a more contemporary musical direction. Other members did not agree, causing a rift. Slash left in 1996 following creative differences with Rose and personal problems with Tobias. New band members auditioned, including guitarist Zakk Wylde and drummers Dave Abbruzzese and Michael Bland, with Reed's friend and roommate Sean Riggs working as a session drummer sporadically during the mid 90s. Slash was replaced in January 1997 by former Nine Inch Nails touring guitarist Robin Finck.

In February 1997, electronic producer Moby entered talks to produce; he said: "They're writing with a lot of loops, and believe it or not, they're doing it better than anybody I've heard lately." Moby pulled out to focus on his solo work. Longtime Guns N' Roses producer Mike Clink is also reported to have been in talks to work on the album that year. Billy Howerdel worked as Pro Tools engineer during the album's early development. He said: "I came in, to start, making sounds for Robin Finck, and that kind of turned into this two-and-a-half-year gig with the band."

In April 1997, following drummer Matt Sorum's firing after an argument with Rose about Tobias's inclusion, the tentative lineup comprised Rose, McKagan, Tobias, Finck, keyboardist Dizzy Reed, and Nine Inch Nails touring drummer Chris Vrenna. After Vrenna left, Josh Freese was hired as full-time drummer in mid-1997. McKagan, who had recently become a father, left in August 1997. According to McKagan, "Guns had been paying rent on studios for three years now—from 1994 to 1997—and still did not have a single song. The whole operation was so erratic that it didn't seem to fit with my hopes for parenthood, for stability."

According to Guns N' Roses' manager, Doug Goldstein, Scott Litt, Steve Lillywhite, and Mark Bell were considered as producers. Chris Pitman joined as second keyboardist and multi-instrumentalist in early 1998. Shortly afterwards, at the recommendation of Freese, former Replacements bassist Tommy Stinson joined. By spring of 1998, Guns N' Roses comprised Rose on vocals, Stinson on bass, Freese on drums, Finck on lead guitar, Tobias on rhythm guitar, and Reed and Pitman on keyboards. They began recording at Rumbo Recorders, a studio in the San Fernando Valley where Guns N' Roses had recorded parts of Appetite for Destruction. Around this time, Geffen paid Rose $1 million to finish the album and offered a further $1 million if he submitted it by March 1, 1999.

Recording

In the summer of 1998, Youth, who had produced U2 and the Verve, was brought in to work on demos and help Rose focus. Youth felt that Rose was not ready to record a new album: "He kind of pulled out ... He was quite isolated. There weren't very many people I think he could trust. It was very difficult to penetrate the walls he'd built up." Frustrated, Youth left the project. Rose later told USA Today he had stopped writing for years in the mid-1990s because of criticism from Slash and McKagan and his ex-fiancée Stephanie Seymour.

The band worked with producer Sean Beavan from autumn 1998 to spring 2000. Stinson said that "most of the songs on the album started and ended with what [Beavan] did". Beavan worked with the band when Rose recorded most of the vocal tracks that appear on the final album in 1999. Rose's vocal parts were recorded in less than a week. Beavan claimed to have worked on 35 songs during his time with the band. By the summer of 1999, Guns N' Roses had recorded over 30 songs and the album was tentatively titled 2000 Intentions.

In May 1999, Queen guitarist Brian May recorded lead guitar for the song "Catcher in the Rye" and other unreleased songs, but his performances were removed. May was not informed and wrote on his website in 2008: "I did put quite a lot of work in, and was proud of it. But I could understand if Axl wants to have an album which reflects the work of the members of the band as it is, right now."

Rose ordered the studio engineers to continue recording ideas the band came up with in his absence. He was sent several CDs and DATs a week, featuring different mixes of possible songs. Eventually, he accumulated over 1000 CDs. In 1999, Rose temporarily abandoned the album so the new lineup could rerecord Guns N' Roses' debut album Appetite For Destruction (1987), with the intent of using newer recording techniques to "spruce up" Appetite. According to Rose, this forced the new members to "get up to the quality they needed to be at" and helped the writing and recording process.

Title announcement and "Oh My God" 

During a 1999 interview, Rose announced the title Chinese Democracy, saying: "There's a lot of Chinese democracy movements, and it's something that there's a lot of talk about, and it's something that will be nice to see. It could also just be like an ironic statement. I don't know, I just like the sound of it." Rose also said the album would feature a "melting pot" of varied sounds, including several heavy and aggressive songs. In late November 1999, Rose played several tracks for Rolling Stone, who likened the new sound to "Led Zeppelin's Physical Graffiti remixed by Beck and Trent Reznor". In 1997 and 1998, sources had described the album as different from previous Guns N' Roses records, with an electronic influence. Chris Vrenna said that Rose wanted to create an album similar to U2 and Brian Eno's collaboration Original Soundtracks 1. Though it was often reported as an industrial rock album, in 2001 Rose said: "It is not industrial ... There will be all kinds of styles, many influences as blues, mixed in the songs."

Rose said in 1999 that the band had recorded enough material for at least two albums, including the potential for an album more industrial and electronic than Chinese Democracy. Sources said the band's initial plans were to record two albums, release Chinese Democracy, tour for a year or two, then release the second album without having to return to the studio.
 
In November 1999, Guns N' Roses released their first new track in five years and the first original song in eight years, the industrial metal song "Oh My God", featured in the film End of Days and released on the soundtrack. The song features Rose, Tobias, Stinson, Reed, Pitman, Finck, and Freese, along with guitarists Dave Navarro (of Jane's Addiction) and Gary Sunshine. "Oh My God" received mixed reviews; AllMusic described it as "a less than satisfying comeback". Rolling Stone suggested the release was a stopgap to pacify fans and offset the mounting recording costs. Beavan, who produced the track, said it was included on soundtrack at the request of Jimmy Iovine, the head of Geffen, who had picked it for the film after listening to several work-in-progress songs.

Lineup changes, Roy Thomas Baker joins as producer and rerecording 
While work was being finished on "Oh My God", Finck left to rejoin Nine Inch Nails. In January 2000, the Guns N' Roses manager, Doug Goldstein, said Chinese Documentary was "99% done" and was set for release in mid-2000. In a February 2000 Rolling Stone interview, Rose said it had been delayed partially because he was learning how to use new recording technology: "It's like from scratch, learning how to work with something, and not wanting it just to be something you did on a computer."

In March 2000, Rose hired the guitarist Buckethead to replace Finck. According to Classic Rock, Buckethead's eccentric stage persona – he wore a blank white mask and a KFC bucket on his head –  made him the "negative image of top-hatted, easygoing Slash", and rumors spread that Buckethead was Slash in disguise. Shortly afterwards, Josh Freese left to join A Perfect Circle, a band recently formed by Howerdel, who had left the project several months earlier. At the recommendation of Buckethead, frequent collaborator Brain was brought in as drummer.

Before the end of spring 2000, Beavan left the project. At this time the album was nearly complete, but after Rose hired Queen producer Roy Thomas Baker to replace Beavan, he was persuaded to do re-recording work on the entire album. Baker felt Freese's drums needed to be rerecorded, as they sounded too "industrial"; Brain said they sounded digital, with "not a lot of air moving". Rose felt that the finished album should reflect the "energy" of those who worked on it, and so felt Freese's drums should be replaced. Geffen employee Tom Zutaut said that Freese's drumming was spectacular". He said: "I would not have wanted to be in Brain's shoes. Basically we were saying to [Brain] 'We have got a brilliant performance of this and now we need you to recreate it'."

Rose had Brain learn Freese's parts note by note; Brain had the parts transcribed, then played them from a teleprompter before trying the songs again in his style. According to Brain, he recorded his parts in eight months and the final album features a hybrid of his and Freese's styles. Frank Ferrer replaced Brain in 2006, who said: "I did a few tracks with Brain and he told me to just make the songs my own. It wasn't so much conscious writing as focusing on how the music made me feel and not overthinking it." According to Ferrer, he is the only drummer on the title track; the rest of the album features drums by Brain and Ferrer, using Freese's arrangements. Bassist Tommy Stinson stated he had to rerecord his bass parts with each change in drummer, saying "I probably ended up completely re-recording each part five or six times over the years." Stinson was later critical of the rerecording process, stating that Baker "wasted many years and many millions of dollars trying to get us better sounds that we could have addressed in the mixing stage."

At the end of Nine Inch Nail's Fragility Tour in July 2000, Finck rejoined the band. Rose had previously threatened to remove Finck's parts from the album after seeing Finck perform with Nine Inch Nails at the 1999 MTV Video Music Awards.

Composers Marco Beltrami and Paul Buckmaster worked on orchestral arrangements. In 2003, Beltrami said of the experience: "I met with Axl and he played me these songs, asked me my ideas about them... I actually wrote some melodies and stuff. The music was eclectic and at the time that I was doing it there were no lyrics on the songs that I was working on."

Tom Zutaut joins 
In February 2001, Jimmy Iovine, the head of Geffen, asked Tom Zutaut, whom the label had fired two years previously, to help Guns N' Roses complete Chinese Democracy. Zutaut was the A&R man who had discovered the band and guided them through the recording of their previous albums. After they had resolved some personal differences, Rose told Zutaut of his frustrations in finding the sounds he wanted; for example, he had instructed the production team to recreate the drum sound of Nirvana's 1991 album Nevermind, but was not satisfied with the results. With Zutaut's intervention, the team recreated the sound to Rose's satisfaction. After having Zutaut approved by Rose's personal psychic, whom Rose believed could assess auras from photographs, Rose arranged for Geffen to pay Zutaut "whatever it takes". Zutaut's only concession was to defer some of his payment until the album was delivered, but the album missed the deadline.

Zutaut said Guns N' Roses had 50 to 60 songs in development during this period. By this point, Buckethead had left, following disagreements with Baker and frustrations over the lack of progress. Zutaut persuaded him to rejoin by installing a giant chicken coop in the studio for him to work in, with furniture, straw, chicken wire, and rubber chicken parts. Zutaut described it as "part chicken coop, part horror movie ... You could almost smell the chickens." Only assistant engineers were allowed to enter, to adjust microphones. Rose's assistant Beta Lebeis downplayed the coop as inexpensive and fun, saying, "It didn't cost money or anything – think about it, it's just wire ... It's something you do in three or four hours. Just for fun, to play a joke on somebody." However, according to Zutaut, the coop caused friction when Buckethead began using it to watch hardcore pornography, disturbing Rose. Zutaut told an interviewer that, after one of Rose's dogs defecated in the coop, Buckethead insisted it not be cleaned up as he liked the smell. After three days, the smell had become overwhelming and the studio staff removed it, upsetting Buckethead.

At Interscope's request, Zutaut investigated the project's budget. He found that the band was spending thousands of dollars a month on rented gear that went unused, and he made changes that he estimated saved around $75,000 a month. Additionally, Rose kept erratic hours, which meant that the salaried musicians, engineers, and assistants were often unable to work. Zutaut said: "These fucking people are getting paid shitloads of money and they're sitting on their arse doing nothing because Axl's not coming to the studio and they can't get him on the phone."

Zutaut tried to convince Rose to release Chinese Democracy as a solo album, feeling it would sell better. However, Rose said in 2008: "I didn't make a solo record. A solo record would be completely different than this and probably much more instrumental. The songs were chosen by everyone involved." Lebeis said in March 2001 that 48 songs had been completed, and that Geffen had begun selecting them for the album. Zutaut estimated that Guns N' Roses had 50 or 60 songs in development. He went through each with Rose, trying to decide which were worth finishing. According to Zutaut, during his time with the band they completed versions of "The Blues", "Madagascar", "Chinese Democracy" and "Atlas Shrugged".

Zutaut and Baker exit
For his 2001 film Black Hawk Down, the filmmaker Ridley Scott asked to use the 1987 Guns N' Roses song "Welcome to the Jungle", from their debut album Appetite for Destruction. According to Zutaut, Rose already had new band members rerecord the entirety of Appetite for Destruction as part of their induction, and so a day was spent mixing one of these versions. Rose attended a screening of Black Hawk Down arranged by Zutaut; however, when he realized it was not a private screening, he fired Zutaut. Zutaut claims he was "set up", a claim disputed by Rose. Zutaut claimed that, by this time, around 11 or 12 tracks were complete but for final mixes, and that the album could have been complete by September 2002. Baker left the project a few months later.

Tour 
On January 1, 2001, Guns N' Roses played at the House of Blues in Las Vegas, Nevada, their first concert in over seven years. This was followed by their headlining performance at Rock in Rio III on January 14, 2001, to an audience of 190,000 people. On August 29, 2002, they made a surprise visit to the MTV Video Music Awards in New York; their set included one new song, "Madagascar". Guitarist Richard Fortus joined in 2002; he said all but his contribution, the chorus to "Better", had been written by the time he joined, and that some riffs on the final album date back to Slash's time in the band.

In August 2002, Rose stated on the Guns N' Roses website: "We feel that we have clarity as to the album we're trying to make, we're wrapping it up. We've sorted it down to what songs are on the record, what the sequence of the songs is. The album art is ready." Shortly afterwards, however, he told MTV News: "You'll see [the album], but I don't know if 'soon' is the word". Reed said in November 2002 that the album would be released by June 2003 and that there were only "a few odds and ends left to do, a couple of finishing touches, a couple of vocals – and we need to mix it". Rose also confirmed plans for multiple albums, and said the delay was a partly due to lack of support from Geffen for older bands, saying: "I've had to do way more jobs in it than I'm supposed to. I've had to be manager, A&R man, producer, sole lyric writer, and a lot of other things."

In 2003, radio DJ Eddie Trunk played a demo of "I.R.S." leaked to him by New York Mets catcher Mike Piazza. He likened it to "Use Your Illusion-era stuff, with some modern flairs to it. The song had a loop track in the beginning, but then, when it kicked in, it was that same dramatic Guns N' Roses hard rock." The same year, The Offspring jokingly released a press release saying their next album would be called "Chinese Democracy (You Snooze, You Lose)," in reference to the album's protracted development; in response, Rose sent the band a cease-and-desist order, to which singer Dexter Holland reacted "I think it got blown up a little more than we intended it to."

In mid-2003, Guns N' Roses reportedly started rerecording Chinese Democracy again. A music journalist said Rose told him in June 2003 that "he wants to make sure it is a perfect as possible before it is released". In 2004, Stinson said Chinese Democracy was "almost done" and had been delayed by "legal issues" and because Rose wanted to ensure every band member had a say in each song: "It's a lengthy process because you have to get eight people to basically write a song together that everyone likes." He also said Rose was a perfectionist; an engineer working on the album said: "Axl wanted to make the best record that had ever been made. It's an impossible task. You could go on infinitely, which is what they've done." Stinson later said:What really happened was the record company stood back and left Axl to his own devices. He had to basically produce himself, and that's not what he (wanted to do)... the record company really dropped the ball on this one ... everything changed when Geffen merged with Interscope. Axl was told that Jimmy Iovine would play more of a role (than he did).In 2004, Buckethead quit and Guns N' Roses canceled their tour. They released a statement saying that Buckethead had been "inconsistent and erratic in both his behaviour and his commitment... His transient lifestyle has made it near impossible to have nearly any form of communications with him whatsoever." Shortly afterwards, Rose released a statement saying that they hoped "to announce a release date within the next few months". Stinson said in September that the album would be in the mastering stages by November 2004.

Conflict with Geffen 
By 2004, Geffen had removed Chinese Democracy from its release schedule and withdrawn funding, stating: "Having exceeded all budgeted and approved recording costs by millions of dollars, it is Mr. Rose's obligation to fund and complete the album, not Geffen's." Around that time, manager Merck Mercuriadis said the album was close to complete. According to a March 2005 New York Times article, production costs for the album had reached $13 million  ($ in current dollar terms), making it probably the most expensive recording "never made". Mercuriadis dismissed the article, writing in a letter that the newspaper's sources had not been involved with the project for several years. At one point, the band was using a budget of almost $250,000 a month. Rose said the expense would be negated by the recording sessions yielding multiple albums.

In February 2006, "I.R.S.", "The Blues", "There Was a Time", "Better" and "Catcher in the Rye" leaked online. The leaked version of "I.R.S." was aired frequently enough on various radio stations prior to the band's management intervening that it charted at #49 on the Radio & Records Active Rock National Airplay Chart for the week ending Feb. 24, 2006. In October, "Better" was inadvertently leaked by Harley-Davidson in an online ad. A "final version" was leaked in February 2007. "Madagascar" was leaked in March 2007. In May 2007, the title track leaked, and updated versions of "Chinese Democracy," "The Blues," "I.R.S." and "There Was a Time" were leaked by professional wrestler Mister Saint Laurent. The final version of "Shackler's Revenge" leaked in August 2008.

Buckethead was replaced by Ron "Bumblefoot" Thal and touring resumed in May 2006. Bumblefoot added guitar to the album between tour legs throughout the year. Bumblefoot wrote guitar parts for every song, trying hundreds of ideas, and contributed fretless guitar. Bumblefoot stated that working with such densely layered songs was a challenge, "..you go into a higher range, so you don't clash with it, and then it's, like, 'Oh, wait. There's that synth thing...' Or you go lower, and it's, like, 'Ah, it's kind of getting eaten up by the rhythms and the bass', so it was a challenge to find the right place." Frank Ferrer replaced Brain in July 2006 and added new drum tracks.
 
Rose held listening parties in several New York bars in 2006, showcasing 10 new songs. In October 2006, Rolling Stone said the album had a "firm" release date of November 21, 2006. According to Rolling Stone, engineer Andy Wallace, who had worked with Nirvana, Sepultura, Slayer, and Bad Religion, was working on the album that year. Stinson stated that most of the album had been recorded collaboratively in 2001, and had been "pretty much done" since then.

On December 14, on the Guns N' Roses website, Rose announced the cancellation of four shows, citing the need for more time to work on Chinese Democracy. He also announced that the band had ended their relationship with Mercuriadis, and announced a tentative release date of March 6, 2007; it was the first time the band had publicly given a release date. In an interview held during the launch party for Korn's 2006 tour, Rose told Rolling Stone that Chinese Democracy was a "complex record", with Queen-like arrangements, and that he expected some fans to complain about the new direction.

In a 2006 Rolling Stone article, former Skid Row frontman Sebastian Bach described Chinese Democracy as "epic" and "mind-blowing": "It's a very cool album—it's badass with killer screams, killer guitar riffs, but it's got a totally modern sound. The word for it is 'grand.' It's fucking epic. [Axl has] reinvented himself yet again." Bach also described the album as having "the rawness and the power of Appetite for Destruction, but it also has the grandiosity of 'November Rain'."

Rose said in 2006 that Guns N' Roses had 32 songs in development, with Bach later confirmed that Rose told him Chinese Democracy would be the first in a trilogy of albums. Rose later in 2008 confirmed the working titles of 10 songs from the upcoming unreleased albums.

Final sessions 
Rose recorded the final vocal tracks in January 2007. On February 22, 2007, the band's road manager Del James issued a press release stating there was no official release date but that recording had ended and mixing had begun. In a 2007 interview, Sebastian Bach said Rose had planned to have the album released by Christmas 2007 and that the delays might have been caused by business problems. In January 2007, Bach recorded backing vocals for "Sorry" at Electric Lady Studios. He described the song as "almost like doom metal with Axl singing really clean over this grinding, slow beat that is fucking mean, I cannot get it out of my head." Harpist Patti Hood, who had worked with Pitman on the album Free Mars, and conductor Suzy Katayama also recorded parts.

In January 2008, rumors arose that Chinese Democracy had been handed to Geffen but was delayed because the label and Rose could not agree on the marketing. Radio host Eddie Trunk said Geffen might have the album and that delays were due to financial reasons. However, in a February 2008 interview with Classic Rock, Rose's personal manager Beta Lebeis dismissed Trunk's suggestion and said they were in negotiations with the label. With a wealth of material to select from, Rose was solely responsible for track selection and sequencing of the album.

According to Bumblefoot, the band and producer Caram Costanzo (who joined in 2003) spent 14 hours a day working on the album. Producers who worked on the album include Bob Ezrin, Eric Caudieux, Sean Beavan, and Tim Palmer. Rose and Caram Costanzo are the producers credited on the finished album, with Baker, Caudieux, Beaven and keyboardist Chris Pitman credited with additional production. The band used 15 studios during production, including Capitol Studios, Cherokee Studios, Electric Lady Studios, Sunset Sound Recorders, and The Village.

Mastering engineer Bob Ludwig offered three versions of the album for approval. Rose and Costanzo selected the version without dynamic-range compression to avoid being involved in the ongoing loudness war. Ludwig wrote: "I was floored when I heard they decided to go with my full dynamics version and the loudness-for-loudness-sake versions be damned ... The fan and press backlash against the recent heavily compressed recordings finally set the context for someone to take a stand and return to putting music and dynamics above sheer level."

Release and promotion

On September 14, 2008, the track "Shackler's Revenge" was included in the music game Rock Band 2, the first official release of new Guns N' Roses material since 1999's "Oh My God". The entire album was made available for the game on April 14, 2009, as downloadable content. It was followed by "If the World", which plays during the closing credits of the 2008 film Body of Lies.

Billboard announced a firm release date for Chinese Democracy, November 23, 2008, on October 9. In the US, the retail release is sold exclusively through Best Buy. The first single, "Chinese Democracy", was released on October 22, 2008. It was debuted on the Opie and Anthony show broadcast by KROQ-FM. "Better" was released as a promo single on November 17, 2008, followed by "Street of Dreams" in March 2009.

Several days before its release, the band streamed the album on their Myspace page. It was streamed over 3 million times, breaking the Myspace record for most streamed album ever. After the album's release, Rose did not appear in public for several months and did not respond to calls from the label to promote the album. On December 12, Rose answered questions and posted statements regarding the record, former bandmates, and tour plans on several Guns N' Roses fan forums. On February 9, 2009, in his first official interview since the release, Rose said he had "no information for me to believe there was any real involvement or effort from Interscope". In a 2018 look back, Billboard decried the marketing for the album, stating: "The most anticipated rock record in history was murdered by a thousand different jabs and body shots, including artwork the artist wasn't committed to, but the colossal marketing blunder was the Tyson-esque knockout punch."

The band announced a new leg of the Chinese Democracy Tour in March 2009, which lasted from December 2009 until December 2012. Finck left before the tour to rejoin Nine Inch Nails; he was replaced by DJ Ashba. A guitar tab book of the album was released in December 2009.

In May 2010, Azoff's company Front Line Management sued Rose over unpaid concert fees. Shortly afterwards, Rose filed a $5 million counter-lawsuit against Azoff claiming Azoff had "sabotaged" the Chinese Democracy release by "purposefully spoiling" the album art, "botching" a sales deal with Best Buy, and leaking songs online. The lawsuit was settled in 2011.

Chinese Democracy was banned in China because of perceived criticism in its title track of the Chinese government and a reference to Falun Gong. The Chinese Communist Party said through media that it "turns its spear point on China".

Leaks 
By the time Chinese Democracy was released, only 3 of the 14 songs had not been leaked or played live. In June 2008, five months before the album's release, music blogger Kevin Cogill streamed nine tracks on his website Antiquiet for "an hour or two". The high volume of traffic crashed the website server and the tracks were removed. In August, the FBI arrested Cogill under the Family Entertainment and Copyright Act for releasing copyrighted material. Slash said: "I hope he rots in jail. It's going to affect the sales of the record, and it's not fair." According to Techdirt, Cogill's arrest resulted in a large boost in illegal downloads of the album. They also revealed that UMG showed Best Buy search engine traffic results shortly after the case to capitalize on the interest and help them with the distribution deal.

In November, Cogill agreed to plead guilty to one federal count of copyright infringement, later reduced to a misdemeanor. According to Cogill, he was not charged for copyright infringement because the court could not prove that the album was being prepared for commercial distribution: "The US government would have to prove, in court, that Chinese Democracy was really coming. And no one at the RIAA or the label had informed the government that these songs had been lying around for 14 years. Only that they had cost $12 million." Cogill was sentenced to two months' house arrest and was required to produce an anti-piracy video with the Recording Industry Association of America (RIAA). He said the video was never made as the RIAA did not want to spend money on production costs.

In 2019, around 100 Chinese Democracy demos leaked online. Zutaut had allowed a storage unit containing several CDs of recordings to expire, allowing its contents to be auctioned off; the winner sold them to a fan, who circulated them online.

Dr Pepper promotion
On March 26, 2008, media reported that soft drinks manufacturer Dr Pepper would offer a free can of its product to everyone in America—excluding former Guns N' Roses guitarists Buckethead and Slash—if the band released Chinese Democracy in 2008. On the Guns N' Roses website, Rose wrote of his surprise at the company's support, and said he would share his Dr Pepper with Buckethead.

After it was announced that the album would be released in 2008, Dr Pepper confirmed that it would uphold its pledge. However, on the album's release, the Dr Pepper website servers crashed under the demand for coupons. Lawyers for the band threatened Dr Pepper's parent company with a lawsuit two days after the album's release; in a letter to the company, Rose's lawyer Alan Gutman said: "The redemption scheme your company clumsily implemented for this offer was an unmitigated disaster which defrauded consumers and, in the eyes of vocal fans, ruined Chinese Democracys release." Gutman also demanded a full-page apology to appear in The Wall Street Journal, USA Today, The New York Times, and Los Angeles Times. Later, in an online interview with fans, Rose said he told his lawyers it was a "non-issue" and was surprised by their actions, and that he believed they should have focused on the record release.

 Copyright infringement 
In October 2009, electronic musician Ulrich Schnauss's record labels Independiente and Domino sued Guns N' Roses, alleging they had infringed copyright by using portions of Schnauss' compositions in the song "Riad 'N the Bedouins". The suit alleges the portions are sampled from Schnauss' Wherever You Are (2001) and A Strangely Isolated Place (2003). Brian Caplan, attorney for Domino, stated that they first contacted Geffen on February 26. Caplan told New York Daily News the label "attempted to explain [the samples] away", and "They tried to justify it".

Guns N' Roses denied the allegations; the band's manager Irving Azoff stated: "The snippets of 'ambient noise' in question were provided by a member of the album's production team who has assured us that these few seconds of sound were obtained legitimately ... While the band resents the implication that they would ever use another artist's work improperly and are assessing possible counterclaims, they are confident this situation will be satisfactorily resolved." The two labels sought $1 million in damages against Geffen for the unauthorized use of the samples.

Unused tracks and follow-up album

Only two additional songs from the recording sessions have been officially released. According to Bumblefoot, one song, "Atlas Shrugged", was cut at the last second because of CD playing-time constraints. Songs mentioned by those involved in the recording that did not make the final album include "Atlas Shrugged", "Oklahoma", "Thyme", "The General", "Elvis Presley and the Monster of Soul", "Ides of March", "Silkworms", "Down by the Ocean", "Zodiac", "Quick Song" and "We Were Lying".

In August 2013, "Going Down", a song recorded during the sessions featuring Tommy Stinson on vocals, was leaked online, as well as several remixes by Brain & future Guns N' Roses keyboardist Melissa Reese. In 2014, Rose said that a "second part" of Chinese Democracy and a remix album were complete and pending release. In 2018, Billboard reported that a follow-up to Chinese Democracy had been planned for 2016, but was put on hold when Slash and Duff McKagan rejoined the band. Guitarist Richard Fortus confirmed work on a new album in 2018. In October 2021, Slash mentioned the band had been reworking songs from the Chinese Democracy period.

Style and composition

Chinese Democracy marked Guns N' Roses' expansion into industrial rock, electronic rock nu metal, and elements of trip hop, while retaining the hard rock style of previous albums. Critics noted stylistic similarities on the album to the work of Queen, Paul McCartney and Wings, and Andrew Lloyd Webber. Rose cited the influence of Dave Grohl's drumming on Nirvana's "Smells Like Teen Spirit" on the title track. The song was inspired by the movie Kundun about the Dalai Lama, as well as three months Rose spent living in China, stating "When you stay in hotels there, you don't realize that the stuff you're seeing on TV, the average person isn't seeing. Everywhere I went, people are scared, they're frightened for their lives to have an opinion that deviates from the government about the simplest things, things that we take for granted." The lyrics "Blame it on the Falun Gong / They've seen the end and you cannot hold on now" from the song caused the album to be banned in China. The song starts with a delayed intro of ambient noise and guitar lines. Spin likened the guitars to the work of Tom Morello. Drummer Josh Freese wrote the main guitar riff, describing it as "really dumb, simple, dirty guitar riff."

"Shackler's Revenge" was written in reaction to Virginia Tech shooter Seung-Hui Cho, who wrote a play based on the lyrics of the Guns N' Roses song "Mr. Brownstone"; Rose responded to "the insanity of senseless school shootings" and the media overreacting to Cho's interest in Guns N' Roses. The song drew comparisons to the music of industrial and electronic artists such as Nine Inch Nails, The Prodigy, Marilyn Manson, Korn and Rob Zombie from critics. The song features elements of industrial rock, electronic rock, nu metal, sludge rock, and alternative rock. Multiple layers of vocals create what Rolling Stone described as "a demented choir". "Better" is an electronic rock-influenced song that features Rose singing in falsetto at the beginning of the track "No one ever told me when / I was alone / They just thought I'd know better", over a "whining guitar line that bubbles and bursts". Rose mentioned the guitar parts in the bridge as among his favorite parts of the album. Loudwire described the song as having an Acid house style beat, while Rolling Stone described the intro as a "hip-hop voicemail".

"Street of Dreams", previously known as "The Blues", is a pop-influenced piano ballad similar to "November Rain" and "The Garden" with influences from Elton John. The song was noted as similar to the works of Queen. On "If The World", Buckethead played a Flamenco guitar; it was described as having "an electronic funk slither", neo soul, nu-metal, and trip hop styles. Keyboardist Chris Pitman stated of the song "It's about environmental decay in its futurist context." Pitman primarily wrote the song on a 12 string guitar, stating "I just started with this riff that allows for a pretty cool vocals... I wrote the drums with a dub / reggae beat... added strings, piano, bass, echo guitar, synth and sub-bass. I gave the recordings to Axl and he added his part by singing in one night." Rose described the writing of the song as a combination of James Bond and 70's Blaxploitation films, with an "intentionally cheesey sounding chorus" to parody James Bond music.

"There Was a Time" is a heavily layered melody driven orchestral song with a mellotron, violins, choirs and multiple synthesizers. Spin noted, "Bluesy piano and slyly cinematic passage set up the highest notes Axl's full-health throat has ever belted." "Catcher in the Rye" was written after Rose watched a documentary on Mark David Chapman and wanted to write a song in dedication to John Lennon; the song is meant to criticize the book The Catcher in the Rye. The song, a power ballad drew comparisons to Oasis as well as Elton John, Queen and the Guns N' Roses song "Yesterdays".
 "Scraped" takes the album back to an industrial rock style with Rose singing "Don't you try to stop us now" and "All things are possible, I am unstoppable." The intro has been described as "highly processed and strange". A vocal bridge on the song was noted as similar to "Get the Funk Out" by Extreme. It also drew comparisons to Soundgarden. Loudwire described the song as a "musical Frankenstein", referencing the effects on Rose's voice.

Discussing the origins of "Riad N' The Bedouins", Rose stated: "Riad is the name my one-time momentary brother-in-law of Erin Everly went by when I knew him. Of part Lebanese descent and a former student of Pepperdine University, he claims to be an international arms dealer." Rose's vocals on the song have been compared to Robert Plant. The song starts with ambient samples of the songs "Wherever You Are" and "A Strangely Isolated Place" by Ulrich Schnauss (see below for information on the lawsuit regarding the samples). Several critics have theorised the song's lyrical content is about the Iraq War. Rose said "Sorry" was about "anyone talking nonsense at mine and the public's expense". The song is a power ballad which features a chorus "I'm sorry for you/Not sorry for me", described as a shot at Rose's former bandmates. The song drew comparisons to Pink Floyd and Metallica, and Rose's vocals were compared to Layne Staley. The A.V. Club noted Rose's "bizarre, quasi-Transylvanian accent" on the line "But I don't want to do it". "I.R.S." has Rose singing "Gonna call the president / Gonna call myself a private eye / Gonna need the IRS / Gonna get the FBI" over a guitar heavy track. The song was also noted for trip-hop influences. Spin mentioned the main riff's similarities to that of Nirvana's "In Bloom".

"Madagascar" has been described as having a "trip hop pulse"; its bridge features interwoven samples of quotations from the movies Mississippi Burning, Casualties of War, Cool Hand Luke, Braveheart, and Seven, and also contains several excerpts from Dr. Martin Luther King Jr.'s speeches "I Have a Dream" and "Why Jesus Called a Man a Fool". Time described it as "Axl's attempt to do Led Zeppelin's Kashmir. Rose said of the quotes "Dr. King's words have been edited together from multiple speeches as to bring the sentiments of his messages into the context of this particular song and to present their importance as strongly as possible." "This I Love" is a song written in 1992 that Rose called "the heaviest thing I've written". The song is a piano ballad with Rose singing to a former lover. Rose described the song stating "It's a lot more intricate than I think most realize yet as the guitar and vocals are placed as they should be so dominant. The main string melody in that section I had originally written to a hip-hop loop as well." Spin compared the song to the works of Andrew Lloyd Webber. "Prostitute" is another orchestral-lined power ballad that features the lyrics "Ask yourself / Why I would choose / To prostitute myself / To live with fortune and shame". According to producer Youth, Rose "labored" over the song because past successes weighed heavily on him. The song was described by Loudwire as "blending classical orchestrations and electro-beats with blistering guitar solos and some of [Rose's] highest pitched shrieking." Consequence of Sound compared Rose's vocals to "Bruce Hornsby with distortion."

Artwork

The cover art features a sepia photograph of a bicycle with a large wicker basket resting against a wall on which the band's name is graffitied; it was photographed in Kowloon Walled City by Terry Hardin. Three red communist stars are above the letters "GNR" on the side with the band name and album title, which are written vertically. According to artistic director Ryan Corey, Rose conceived the bike cover at the album's inception.

Rose approached Chinese artist Chen Zhuo for permission to use a painting of Tiananmen Square as an amusement park for the album cover, but Zhuo declined due to China's strict censorship laws and risks collaborating with a potentially controversial project. Shi Lifeng's painting "Controlling No. 3" was chosen by Rose and used as an alternate cover for an "art edition". It was used for the Rock Band 2 download and released on CD in small quantities. The alternate booklet opens with a short essay written by Rose titled "Fear N' Freedom: The Future of China and Western Society". The album booklet features several artworks by Lifeng, including a bloodied fist holding a star covered by flailing human figures. Photographs of the Hong Kong skyline and the Chinese military also appear in the booklet. The booklet also includes pictures of Rose, Buckethead, Stinson, Pitman, Finck, Fortus, Bumblefoot, Reed, Brain, and Ferrer alongside lyrics to the songs.

Rose stated in December 2008 that two alternate booklets were pending release, adding "the artwork has always been something I've been passionate about, and to release the album with unapproved and unseen final artwork with a 1st work only error filled draft when others more recent were readily available still has not been explained." However, plans fell through and only the "art edition" was released in limited quantities. Bassist Tommy Stinson stated the label "ripped away" from Rose the artwork "right at the last second, when he wasn't ready."

Critical reception

Chinese Democracy was met with generally positive reviews. At Metacritic, which assigns a normalized rating out of 100 to reviews from mainstream critics, the album received an average score of 64, based on 28 reviews. Los Angeles Times writer Ann Powers called it "a test for contemporary ears" and "a cyborgian blend of pop expressiveness, traditional rock bravado and Brian Wilson-style beautiful weirdness". Chuck Klosterman, writing for The A.V. Club, praised the vocals and guitar parts but criticized some production elements. Rolling Stone writer David Fricke commended Rose's unrestrained approach and called it "a great, audacious, unhinged and uncompromising hard-rock record". Rolling Stone later ranked the album number 12 on its year-end list of 2008's best albums. Jon Dolan from Blender found some of the music "ludicrous" and other parts "brilliant", writing that "these aren't songs, they're suites, energetic and skittering and unpredictable hard rock hydras cut with miasmic industrial grind, stadium rattling metal solos, electronic drift and hip-hop churn." Writing for MSN Music, Robert Christgau said Rose succeeds on "his own totally irrelevant terms" and added, "Since he's no longer capable of leading young white males astray, this effort isn't just pleasurable artistically. It's touching on a human level. Noble, even. I didn't think he had it in him." CTV News compared the production to the Wall of Sound style of Phil Spector.

In a mixed review, Chicago Tribune writer Greg Kot found Rose's production over-embellished. The Guardian criticized the album as incohesive and "exhausting", but praised Rose's melodies. Pitchfork complimented the vocals but criticized the "dated" sound. Q considered the album overproduced, stating "by throwing everything at the wall and nailing up the stuff that didn't stick, [Rose has] done himself a grand disservice". Kitty Empire, writing for The Observer, accused Rose of "cribbing" from the industrial rock of Nine Inch Nails. The New York Times described Chinese Democracy as "a transitional album". Rock biographer Stephen Davis was more vitriolic and named Chinese Democracy "the worst album ever".

The album was nominated for the Juno Award for International Album of the Year in 2009, losing to Coldplay's Viva la Vida or Death and All His Friends. The song "If the World" was nominated for Best Original Song at the 13th Satellite Awards, losing to "Another Way to Die" by Jack White and Alicia Keys.

The album's polarizing reception led to it being included on several publication's year end worst-of lists,  as well as best-of lists.

Former band members' opinions
Several former members of Guns N' Roses gave their opinion on the album after release. Slash reacted positively to the title track, stating "That sounds cool. It's good to hear Axl's voice again, y'know?" When the album was released, Slash said, "It's a really good record. It's very different from what the original Guns N' Roses sounded like, but it's a great statement by Axl ... It's a record that the original Guns N' Roses could never possibly make. And at the same time it just shows you how brilliant Axl is." He subsequently stated the album was "exactly what I thought it would sound like", with many synthesizers and digital augmentations. After rejoining the band for the Not in This Lifetime tour in 2016, Slash complimented Buckethead's guitar parts and spoke of the album in a 2018 interview, stating "You know, it is very different. It's really cool stuff, but it was played by guitar players that are very different from me, style-wise.... I also want to give credit where credit's due – the guitar players that played on Chinese Democracy... are fucking amazing guitar players."

Soon after its release, Izzy Stradlin said "I have listened to some tracks off the record and I enjoyed them" and "I like what I've heard". Steven Adler, when asked if he liked the album, said "Not one bit. I didn't recognize Axl's voice on it. There's occasional parts where he does his loud scream but I didn't even know it was him." He also criticized labeling the album as a Guns N' Roses album, stating it should have been released as an Axl Rose solo album. Gilby Clarke stated "I think it's a really good record—I honestly do ... Knowing [the] direction [in which] he wanted to take the band, I think he hit the nail on the head; I think he did a great job". Duff McKagan praised the album, saying "Axl sounds amazing" and "I think Axl's finally made the record he always wanted to". Matt Sorum stated he was "pleasantly surprised" by the title track, and called the album a "toe-tapper". Founding Guns N' Roses guitarist Tracii Guns said he thought it was "over-indulgent, sterile and not that exciting".

Accolades

 Legacy 

Chinese Democracy's protracted recording process attracted extensive media coverage. According to Spin, a cottage industry grew around covering its development; "the only way the record could have lived up to its legend would have been to never come out at all". Five years after its release, Grantland journalist Steven Hyden wrote: "For years, it was widely assumed Chinese Democracy would never come out; in retrospect, the delay is all anybody cares about ... As music, Chinese Democracy is merely the second-worst GNR record; as a figure of speech, it is shorthand for the grandest of boondoggles." Hyden wrote that the album had served as a lesson for acts who took years to release "comeback" albums, demonstrating the perils of allowing backstory to overshadow the work and failing to provide a familiar product. He compared Chinese Democracy to subsequent, successful comeback albums by acts including Daft Punk, David Bowie, Justin Timberlake and My Bloody Valentine, which were "more modest" and offered "well-trod musical territory associated with each artist". Ultimate Classic Rock noted the album's reception, stating "The fact that it was, by all standards, a fairly good album, was completely eclipsed by its backstory" and stating that artists such as Bowie, Steve Perry and Tool used the album as an example "by keeping a low profile during production and staying relatively faithful to what fans expected" for long-awaited albums.

The New York Times saw the album as a "loud last gasp from the reign of the indulged pop star"; where Rose had once commanded "loyal audiences, bountiful royalties, escalating ambitions and dangerously open-ended deadlines", the music business in the early 21st century had become "leaner" and "leakier". Jim DeRogatis compared the album to the movie The Godfather Part III, claiming it was a "late-career installment in a beloved franchise that we never thought we'd see," but lamenting that it was "nowhere near enough to stand as an equal artistic accomplishment."

In 2012, Complex named Chinese Democracy amongst "50 Albums That Were Unfairly Hated On", praising Roses's vocals and the musicianship of the band and stating that the album's  biggest flaw were the delays in release. In a 2015 review inducting the album into their "New Classic Albums" category, Artistdirect praised the album, calling it "a timeless work of art". In a 2018 look back, Billboard called the album a "sonic anomaly" of the time due to the mixing and lack of compression making it sound "vintage or alien to rock music fans". A 2018 retrospective review by No Recess magazine compared the album to "their own version of Danzig's Blackacidevil", stating "[After the 90's] the only thing left was to repeat or radically reinvent themselves. Chinese Democracy tries to do both, to varying degrees of 'okay, sure'."

In 2021, Ultimate Guitar called the album "unfairly maligned" while highlighting "There Was a Time" as the standout track. Journalist Gary Graff stated "its sprawling, indulgent insanity is maybe even more fun to hear now than it was at the time" after re-listening to the album in 2021. In 2022, Loudwire placed the album on a list of "10 Hated Rock + Metal Albums That Are Better Than You Remember", stating "And it may be a mess, but there are still some great jams here."

Sales

Best Buy purchased 1.3 million copies of Chinese Democracy from UMG for $14 million ($ in current dollar terms) before release and pledged not to return unsold copies. The album was released on November 22, 2008, in Germany, Switzerland, and Austria. It was released the following day worldwide, except for the United Kingdom, where it was released on November 24.

Chinese Democracy debuted at number three on the US Billboard 200 chart, selling 261,000 copies in its first week, well below expectations. It debuted at number two on the UK Albums Chart. Second-week US sales dropped significantly and it fell from #3 to #18 on the Billboard chart: a 78% drop. The programming director at KLOS-FM said the low sales were due to the holiday season release and lackluster lead single, while Reuters blamed the Best Buy exclusive deal for lower than expected sales in the US. Critics also cited Rose's lack of promotional appearances as a factor.

After selling 21,000 copies in its sixth week and charting at #30, Chinese Democracy was certified Gold, passing the 500,000-shipped mark on January 7, 2009. It was certified Platinum by the RIAA on February 3, 2009, having shipped one million copies in the United States. It placed 55th on the 2009 Billboard 200 Year End charts.

Chinese Democracy won an IFPI European Platinum Award, having sold more than one million copies in Europe, and had sold 2.6 million units worldwide by February 2009, according to Universal Music. It reached triple platinum certification in Canada and was awarded platinum certifications in many countries including Finland, the Czech Republic, Germany, Ireland, Italy, Norway, Poland, Romania, Switzerland, the United Kingdom, Argentina, Australia, New Zealand, and South Africa. It was certified gold in Austria, Belgium, Denmark, France, Greece, Hungary, the Netherlands, Sweden, Indonesia, Japan, Malaysia, Singapore, Taiwan, Thailand, Brazil, and Colombia. After Best Buy put the album on clearance for $2 in April 2011, it re-entered the US Billboard 200 chart in the week ending April 3, 2011 at #198, selling 3,200 copies. By then, the album had sold 614,000 copies in the US, according to Nielsen Soundscan. In the UK, it had sold 365,899 copies by July 2014. After the 2016 Not in This Lifetime... Tour reunion tour (during which most songs from the album were played), Billboard reported the album's digital streams jumped from 8 million streams to 24 million, as well as 7,900 additional copies sold.

Track listing
Songwriting credits via ASCAP.

Personnel
Credits adapted from the album's liner notes.Guns N' RosesAxl Rose – lead vocals (all tracks), keyboards (tracks 1, 6 and 13), synthesizers (tracks 6, 12 and 13), piano (tracks 7, 13 and 14), guitar (tracks 6 and 12), samples (track 12), arrangements and digital editing (all tracks), production, Logic Pro engineering, mixing, art direction (Alternative booklets)
Robin Finck – guitar (all tracks), keyboards (tracks 3 and 5), acoustic guitar (track 10), arrangements, editing and initial production (track 3)
Bumblefoot – guitar (all tracks)
Buckethead – guitar (all tracks except 7 and 13), acoustic guitar (track 5), arrangements (tracks 2, 8 and 10)
Paul Tobias – guitar (tracks 1, 3–7, 9, 11, 12 and 14), piano (track 6), arrangements (tracks 1 and 11)
Richard Fortus – guitar (tracks 1, 3–4, 6 and 14)
Tommy Stinson – bass guitar (all tracks except 5), backing vocals (tracks 1, 3, 4, 6 and 9), arrangements (track 9)
Brain – drums (all tracks except 1), arrangements (tracks 2–4, 6, 10, 12 and 14), initial production (tracks 2 and 10), engineering (track 10), drum machine and drum programming (track 11), Logic Pro engineering
Frank Ferrer – drums (tracks 1, 3, 5, 6 and 11)
Dizzy Reed – keyboards (tracks 1–4, 6–9, 11 and 14), backing vocals (tracks 1, 3, 4, 6 and 9), synthesizers (tracks 4, 6, 13 and 14), piano (tracks 4 and 5), arrangements (tracks 4, 6, 12 and 14), Logic Pro engineering
Chris Pitman – keyboards (tracks 1–8, 10, 12 and 13), sub-bass (all tracks), synthesizers (tracks 4, 6, 13 and 14), bass and drum programming (tracks 5, 6 and 12), backing vocals (tracks 1, 3 and 6), twelve-string guitar, drum machine and string machine (track 5), Mellotron (track 6), arrangements (tracks 5, 6, 12, 13), digital editing (tracks 5, 12 and 13), engineering (track 1), additional production, Logic Pro engineering
Josh Freese – arrangements (tracks 4, 6, 9 and 14)Additional musiciansMarco Beltrami – orchestra and arrangements (tracks 4, 6 and 12–14)
Paul Buckmaster – orchestra and arrangements (tracks 4, 6, 12 and 14)
Suzy Katayama – arrangements (tracks 6, 12 and 13), French horn (track 12)
Sebastian Bach – backing vocals (track 10)
Patti Hood – harp (track 13)DesignRyan Corey – art direction, design
Somyot Hananuntasuk – illustrations
Sasha Volkova – illustration
Terry Hardin – cover photography
George Chin – photography
Shi Lifeng – artwork (Red Star; 'Controlling' alternate Red Hand cover)
Illustrations (alternate booklets): Lie Yuan, He An, Jiang Congi, Kevin Zuckerman, Lian Xue Ming, Anton S. Kandinsky, Marat Bekeev, Xiao Ping, Lou Jie, Sandra Yagi, Socar Myles, Rankin, Johnie Hurtig, Gloria GaddisProduction'

Caram Costanzo – engineering and digital editing (all tracks), arrangements (tracks 2, 3, 6, 8 and 14), initial production (track 8), sub drums (track 13), production, mixing
Roy Thomas Baker – additional production and preproduction
Engineering:  Jeff "Critter" Newell, Dan Monti, Jeremy Blair
Eric Caudieux – digital editing (all tracks), drum machine and drum programming (track 5), arrangements (tracks 6), sub drums (track 13), additional production, Pro Tools engineering
Sean Beavan – recording and digital editing (tracks 1, 4–6, 9, 11, 12 and 14), arrangements (tracks 1, 4, 6, 9 and 11), initial production (tracks 4–6, 11 and 12), additional production
Youth – initial arrangement suggestions, Additional Demo Pre-production (track 12)
Pete Scaturro – arrangements and initial production (tracks 2 and 10), keyboards, digital editing and engineering (track 10)
Billy Howerdel – recording and editing (track 6), Logic Pro engineering
Stuart White – Logic Pro engineering
John O'Mahony – Pro Tools mixing
Engineering Assistance: Okhee Kim, Andy Gwynn, Brian Monteath, Dave Dominguez, Jose Borges, Joe Peluso, Christian Baker, James Musshorn, Jan Petrov, Jeff Robinette, Bob Koszela, Paul Payne, Mark Gray, Xavier Albira, Dror Mohar, Eric Tabala, Shawn Berman, Donald Clark, Shinnosuke Miyazawa, Vanessa Parr, John Beene, Al Perrotta
Additional Pro Tools: Greg Morgenstein, Paul DeCarli, Billy Bowers, Justin Walden, Rail Jon Rogut, Isaac Abolin
Andy Wallace – mixing
Mixing Assistance: Mike Scielzi, Paul Suarez
Bob Ludwig – mastering

Charts

Weekly charts

Year-end charts

Certifications and sales

Singles

See also

List of longest gaps between studio albums
List of media notable for being in development hell

References

Footnotes

Further reading
Chinese Whispers – The Secret History of the New Studio Album
Classic Rock Magazine: The Making of Chinese Democracy
New York Times: The Most Expensive Album Never Made

External links

Chinese Democracy at YouTube (streamed copy where licensed)

2008 albums
Geffen Records albums
Guns N' Roses albums
Industrial rock albums
Industrial albums by American artists
Hard rock albums by American artists
Electronic rock albums by American artists
Nu metal albums by American artists
Albums recorded at Electric Lady Studios
Albums recorded at Capitol Studios
Albums recorded at Sunset Sound Recorders
Albums produced by Mike Clink
Albums produced by Youth (musician)
Albums produced by Roy Thomas Baker
Albums produced by Sean Beavan
Sampling controversies
Albums involved in plagiarism controversies